Duggirala was one of the 294 Legislative Assembly constituencies of Andhra Pradesh state in India. It was in Guntur district and was dissolved before the 2009 elections and most of its area is now in Tenali (Assembly constituency), Mangalagiri Assembly constituency and Repalle Assembly constituency.

History of the constituency
The Duggirala constituency was first created for the Madras state Legislative Assembly in 1952. After the passing of the States Reorganisation Act, 1956, it became a part of the new Andhra Pradesh Legislative Assembly. After the passing of the Delimitation of Parliamentary and Assembly Constituencies Order, 1976, its extent was the Duggirala, Kollipar and Kollur firkas in Tenali taluk of Guntur district.

It was not present in the Delimitation of Parliamentary and Assembly Constituencies Order, 2008 and hence was defunct as of the 2009 Andhra Pradesh Legislative Assembly election.

Members of the Legislative assembly

Election results

2004

1999

1952

See also
List of constituencies of the Andhra Pradesh Legislative Assembly
Guntur district

References

Guntur district
Former assembly constituencies of Andhra Pradesh